Events in the year 1956 in Bulgaria.

Incumbents 

 General Secretaries of the Bulgarian Communist Party: Todor Zhivkov
 Chairmen of the Council of Ministers: Valko Chervenkov (from 1950 until April 17) Anton Yugov (from April 17 until 1962)

Events 

 13 December – Uzunbodzhak (also known as Ouzounboudjak and Lopushna), a UNESCO Biosphere Reserve, was established.
 The Nesebar Archaeological museum was founded.

Sports 

 Spartak Sofia, an ice hockey team in Sofia, was founded.

References 

 
1950s in Bulgaria
Years of the 20th century in Bulgaria
Bulgaria
Bulgaria